Gigantorhynchida is an order containing a single family, Gigantorhynchidae of parasitic worms that attach themselves to the intestinal wall of terrestrial vertebrates. Gigantorhynchida contains the following three genera:

Gigantorhynchus Hamann, 1892
The genus Gigantorhynchus is characterized by the presence of a cylindrical proboscis with a crown of robust hooks at the apex followed by numerous small hooks on the rest of the proboscis. The body, or trunk, is long with pseudosegmentation, the lemnisci are filiform, and the testes are ellipsoid. Species of Gigantorhynchus are distinguished based on the number and size of hooks on the crown of the proboscis, the type of pseudosegmentation, and size of the ellipsoid eggs. Males of all species possess eight cement glands which are used to temporarily close the posterior end of the female after copulation. There is pronounced sexual dimorphism with the female often two or more times longer than the male.

Intraproboscis 
Mediorhynchus Van Cleave, 1916

Taxonomy

Notes

References

Acanthocephala families
Archiacanthocephala